Banu Hamdan (Musnad: 𐩠𐩣𐩵𐩬) is an ancient, large, and prominent Arab tribe in northern Yemen.

Origins and location
The Hamdan stemmed from the eponymous progenitor Awsala (nickname Hamdan) whose descent is traced back to the semi-legendary Kahlan. Their abode was, and still is, in northern Yemen, in the region north of Sanaa extending toward Marib and Najran to the east, Saada to the north and to the Red Sea coast to the west. Until the present day, the Hamdan's Bakil branch dominates the eastern part of this territory, and its Hashid branch dominates the western part. Parts of the Hamdan migrated through different parts of the Islamic world, where they eventually became dispersed, though they formed a distinct community in the Arab garrison town of Kufa, established following the Muslim conquest of Iraq in the 630s.

History
The Hamdan was mentioned in Sabaic inscriptions as qayls of Hashid, who later acquired control over a part of Bakil and finally gave their clan name to tribal confederations including Hashid and Bakil.

At least a portion of the Hamdan sent a deputation, led by the poet Malik ibn Namat and the prince Abu Thawr Dhu'l-Mashar, the Islamic prophet Muhammad in 631 seeking an alliance with him. More Hamdani tribesmen submitted to Islam during the expedition to the Yemen led by Muhammad's cousin and son-in-law Ali in 631 or 632. Muhammad placed the Bakil tribesman as his deputy over the Hamdan. The tribe largely remained loyal to the early Muslim state during the Ridda wars which broke out following Muhammad's death in 632.

The Hamdani soldiers who settled in Kufa during and after the Muslim conquest of Iraq became fervent supporters of Ali during his caliphate in 656–661, and his sons Hasan and Husayn after him. During the Battle of Siffin in 657, they contributed some 12,000 men to Ali's army against his opponent Mu'awiya ibn Abi Sufyan of Syria, and their leader, Sa'id ibn Qays al-Hamdani, played a prominent role in the battle. Other notable members in Kufa during the following period included Amir ibn Shahr and the poet A'sha Hamdan.

Branches

Hashid and Bakil
Today still in the same ancient tribal form in Yemen, Hashid and Bakil of Hamdan remain in the highlands of Upper Yemen living in Sana'a in the south to and including Sa'ada in the north, living in al-Jawf in the east to Hajjah in the west, including 'Amran in between.

Banu Yam
Banu Yam settled to the North of Bakil in Najran (today in Saudi Arabia). It also branched into the tribes: the 'Ujman plural of "AlAjmi" who inhabited eastern Saudi Arabia and the Arabic Gulf coast.

Banu Kharf
Banu kharf  They are from the Hamdan tribes and live in northern Yemen, specifically in the governorate of Amran, and they migrated to the Prophet Muhammad in order to announce their Islam and their sheikh is a Mujahid

Bibliography 

Andrey Korotayev. Ancient Yemen. Oxford: Oxford University Press, 1995.

References

Bibliography

Further reading
 Almsaodi, Abdulaziz. Modern history of Yemen

 
1st-millennium BC establishments
Tribes of Arabia
Yemeni tribes
Tribes of Saudi Arabia